This is a list of flag bearers who have represented Cape Verde at the Olympics.

Flag bearers carry the national flag of their country at the opening ceremony of the Olympic Games.

See also
Cape Verde at the Olympics

References

Cape Verde at the Olympics
Cape Verde
Olympic flagbearers
Olympics